Vaillancourt Fountain, sometimes called Quebec libre!,  is a large fountain in Embarcadero Plaza in San Francisco, designed by the Québécois artist Armand Vaillancourt in 1971. Long considered controversial because of its stark, modernist appearance, there have been several unsuccessful proposals to demolish the fountain over the years. It was the site of a free concert by U2 in 1987, when lead singer Bono spray painted graffiti on the fountain and was both praised and criticized for the action.

Location

The fountain is in a highly visible spot on the downtown San Francisco waterfront, in Justin Herman Plaza, where Market Street meets The Embarcadero. The Hyatt Regency Hotel is at the edge of the plaza, adjacent to the other four highrise towers of the Embarcadero Center. Across The Embarcadero is the Ferry Building, and the eastern end of the California Street cable car line is on the other side of the Hyatt Regency Hotel.

When Vaillancourt designed the fountain, the elevated Embarcadero Freeway or Interstate 480, was still in existence along the Embarcadero. The fountain was designed with the freeway environment in mind, but it was built to bring people to an expansive public space, as San Francisco Chronicle architecture critic John King calls it "an act of defiant distraction until the freeway came down in 1991".

Design and construction

Vaillancourt Fountain was a product of the redevelopment of San Francisco that took place in the 1950s and 1960s. The Transamerica Pyramid was constructed from 1969-1972.  BART was also being constructed; the Embarcadero Station would eventually open in 1976, three years after the other stations along Market.

Justin Herman, for whom the plaza was named, was a leading figure in this process and the executive director of the redevelopment agency in charge.  The plaza was one of several plazas proposed in the 1962 redevelopment analysis What to do About Market Street,  including Hallidie Plaza and United Nations Plaza, which were also completed in the mid-1970s.  That 1962 analysis was written by planners Livingston and Blayney, landscape architect Lawrence Halprin, architects Rockrise & Watson, and Larry Smith Co. real estate consultants.

Plans for Embarcadero Plaza were drawn up by Mario Ciampi, John Savage Bolles, and Halprin.  In August 1966 a committee consisting of those three, plus sculptor and Art Commission member Sally Hellyer, invited six sculptors to submit models for a loosely defined "monumental abstract sculpture".  By December five had responded:  Jacques Overhoff, Reuben Nakian, Alicia Penalba, James Melchert, and Vaillancourt.  The committee chose 38-year-old Vaillancourt but his second model, meant to show development of the design, did not even resemble the first model.  By November 1968 Hellyer had been replaced by Ruth Asawa, who rejected the design, saying in part, "I for one, am not willing to remain silent while we play the old game of the emperor's new clothes on the unsuspecting people of this city." For his part, Halprin was quoted as saying that if the fountain didn't prove to be among the "great works of civic art ... I am going to slit my throat".

The fountain looks unfinished, like concrete that has not been completely mixed. Up close, it is very rough and textured. There are several square pillars or cubed tubes that form a semi circle inside a pentagon shaped pool. The natural colored pillars jut out and crisscross from the corner of the plaza "like the tentacles of some immense geometrical octopus. ... breaking open." There are two bridges, or walk ways (with stairs), that allow the public to stand between the tubes and have a view overlooking the plaza and city. A series of platforms at pool level permit pedestrian entry into the fountain and behind the falling water. The fountain and plaza are easily accessible to the public at all times and in all conditions, rain or shine. The fountain's budget was US $310,000. It was dedicated on April 22, 1971. The Los Angeles Times reported that its cost was US $607,800.

History

Just before the dedication, the slogan "Quebec Libre" (a reference to the Quebec sovereignty movement) was painted on the fountain at night, and the graffiti was erased. During the dedication, attended by Thomas Hoving, director of New York's Metropolitan Museum of Art, a rock band played, and Armand Vaillancourt himself painted "Quebec Libre" on the fountain in as many places as he could reach. A redevelopment agency employee started to paint over the slogans during the ceremony, but Herman stopped him, saying it could be done later. When asked about why he defaced his own fountain with graffiti he responded, "No, no. It's a joy to make a free statement. This fountain is dedicated to all freedom. Free Quebec! Free East Pakistan! Free Viet Nam! Free the whole world!" Vaillancourt said his actions were "a powerful performance" intended to illustrate the notion of power to the people. "Quebec Libre" has been an alternate name for the fountain since.

Flamin' Groovies performed there, on the 19th September, 1979, and the concert was broadcast on KSAN (FM).

1987 U2 concert

On the first leg of The Joshua Tree Tour by the rock band U2 in 1987, they performed concerts at the Cow Palace just south of San Francisco on April 24 and April 25, 1987. On the third leg of the tour, concerts had been announced for November 14 and 15, 1987, across the San Francisco Bay, at the Oakland Coliseum.

On the morning of November 11, 1987, local radio stations announced that U2 would hold a free-admission concert that day in Justin Herman Plaza, with the stage set up in front of the Vaillancourt Fountain. Within a few hours, a crowd estimated at 20,000 people gathered in the plaza. The concert was jokingly called "Save the Yuppies", in reference to the 1987 stock market crash that had taken place three weeks earlier.

The band closed their nine-song performance with their hit "Pride (In the Name of Love)". During the instrumental portion in the middle of the song, Bono, lead singer of the band, climbed onto the sculpture and spray painted graffiti on it, reading "Rock N Roll Stops The Traffic". Mayor Dianne Feinstein, who had been waging a citywide campaign against graffiti that had resulted in over 300 citations during the year, was angry and criticized Bono for defacing a San Francisco landmark. She said, "I am disappointed that a rock star who is supposed to be a role model for young people chose to vandalize the work of another artist. The unfortunate incident marred an otherwise wonderful rock concert." Bono was issued a citation for misdemeanor malicious mischief.  U2 manager Paul McGuinness said, "This is clearly not an act of vandalism. This act was clearly in the spirit of the artwork itself." The numerous callers to Ronn Owens' radio talk show on KGO-AM were evenly split, with younger listeners defending the singer's action and older ones not.  Bono soon apologized, saying "I really do regret it. It was dumb." The singer explained that he thought that he was honoring the artist's work and that the artist had agreed, but later Bono realized that the city owned the fountain. The group covered the cost of removal of the graffiti.

Armand Vaillancourt flew from Quebec to California after the incident, and spoke in favor of Bono's actions at U2's Oakland performance several days later. Vaillancourt said, "Good for him. I want to shake his hand. People get excited about such a little thing." The sculptor spray-painted a slogan of his own on the band's stage, "Stop the Madness".

The episode received further attention when it was featured in U2's 1988 documentary film Rattle and Hum. There, footage of it was shown over, and interspersed with, the band's opening number, "All Along the Watchtower", a song by Bob Dylan that had been a big hit for Jimi Hendrix. This has led some people to misidentify the song being played when the spray painting occurred. In any case, the fountain and plaza ended up on one U2 fan site's list of recommended group-related places in the U.S. to visit.

Demolition proposals

Following the 1989 Loma Prieta earthquake, the elevated Embarcadero Freeway was so badly damaged that it was torn down, and was replaced by a boulevard at ground level. An architect hired by the city also proposed demolition of the fountain, but no decision was made.

In 2004, San Francisco Supervisor Aaron Peskin renewed the call to demolish the fountain. The water supply to the fountain had been turned off for several years, because of California's energy crisis of those years. Armand Vaillancourt immediately pledged that he would "fight like a devil to preserve that work". Debra Lahane, a member of the San Francisco Arts Commission, said that "it succeeds as a work of art if it provokes dialogue and discussion. Art that engages the public has had a measure of success." Within a few months, the water was flowing again, and plans to tear down the fountain were abandoned.

On and off

At the fountain's opening in 1971, both the water flow and human participation were considered integral to the work. Alfred Frankenstein, writing for the San Francisco Chronicle, noted "the heart of the idea is the unique one of public entry into and intimate exploration of the fountain's innards; in this it is unique and decidedly a success. It is not a great work of sculpture, which is like observing that an automobile is not much of a success as a horse."

The water was turned off at the fountain from 2001 until 2004, reopening on August 2, 2004. San Francisco estimated the cost of electricity was approximately US $200,000 per year to operate the fountain. Peskin negotiated a public-private partnership where the city would pay for the operating costs (at a revised estimate of US $76,000 per year) and Boston Properties would pay for maintenance (estimated at US $20,000 per year). The fountain was shut off again during the winter of 2007–08 starting in November 2007 so that skaters at the Justin Herman Plaza ice rink would not be splashed. It reopened on January 21, 2008.

In reaction to the 2011–17 California drought, all of San Francisco's public fountains were shut off in order to conserve water. Vaillancourt Fountain was turned off in 2014 for the drought, but after that drought ended, the Recreation and Park department cited lack of funds to make repairs to the Vaillancourt Fountain as the reason it had not been reactivated. The estimated cost of rehabilitation to allow water to flow again was approximately US $500,000.

Charles Desmarais, the current art critic of the San Francisco Chronicle echoed Frankenstein's comments from 1971, calling for the water to return in an August 2017 opinion article:

On August 15, 2017, water was restored to the fountain as a test run, with the intention that it will stay on until November, when the ice rink reopens. The water has been dyed with the 'Blue Lagoon' aquatic dye to control the growth of algae and bacteria. The nontoxic aquatic dye attenuates the penetration of light into the water, and tints the water blue.

Critical reaction
The fountain has been considered controversial since its construction, and criticism of it has continued over the years. Hoving, in his dedication speech, said of the fountain had some of the daring of Baroque sculpture and that "A work of art must be born in controversy."  Herman himself said it was "one of the greatest artistic achievements in North America."

At the time of its dedication, the San Francisco chapter of the National Safety Council said that the fountain "may be a safety hazard". Opponents of the work handed out leaflets at the dedication of the fountain describing it as a "loathsome monstrosity", a "howling obscenity", an "obscene practical joke", "idiotic rubble", and a "pestiferous eyesore". Art critic Alfred Frankenstein of the San Francisco Chronicle responded that "its very outrageousness and extravagance are part of its challenge" and therefore, it "can't be all bad." He added that the fountain was intended to be participated in rather than just observed. 
An early comment by architecture critic Allan Temko, often repeated over the years, describes "technological excrescences" that had been "deposited by a giant concrete dog with square intestines". Another pithy remark that gained press attention, from critic Lloyd Skinner, was that the fountain was "Stonehenge, unhinged, with plumbing troubles".

Artists have been critical of the work as well.  Sculptor Benny Bufano called it "a jumble of nothing", artist Willard Cox likened it to "dynamited debris", and sculptor Humphrey Diaquist said it had been created by "a figure of deranged talent". Ruth Asawa noted in 1989 that "In the attempt to provide a disguise and diversion from the freeway, the goal of the fountain as a work of art was lost."

The fountain has been called the "least revered modernist work of art" in San Francisco.  Due to its size, it has been said that it "dominates the landscape" of the north side of Justin Herman Plaza. It has also been said that the design intent was "to mock and mirror the clumsy, double-decked roadway", referring to the elevated Embarcadero Freeway which separated the fountain from the waterfront at the time of construction.

Charles Birnbaum, noted Halprin expert, stated the architect "always wanted people to interact with his water features" and that Justin Herman Plaza "was intended as a total environment, a space animated by people as well as water", so the fountain was designed to attract the public to an area otherwise cut off from the waterfront by the Embarcadero Freeway.

Gallery

See also

Vive le Québec libre

References

Further reading

 
San Francisco Chronicle - photo of Bono spray painting the Vaillancourt Fountain
Art Inventories Catalog: Smithsonian American Art Museum - Vaillancourt Fountain, (sculpture)
 

1971 sculptures
Fountains in California
Graffiti in the United States
Market Street (San Francisco)
Outdoor sculptures in San Francisco
U2
Vandalized works of art in California
Works by Canadian people
Financial District, San Francisco